is a character for a kind of administrative division. It may refer to:

Counties of the People's Republic of China (written in modern orthography as ), sub-provincial administrative division
County (Taiwan), top-level administrative division
Hyeon, former administrative division in Korea abolished during the late Joseon Dynasty
Huyện, sub-provincial administrative unit of Vietnam
Prefectures of Japan (written in modern orthography as ), top-level administrative divisions